The Fair Trade Commission (FTC) is an independent government agency subordinate to the Executive Yuan which is responsible for competition policy, trade practices, formulating fair trade policy, laws, regulations, investigating activities restricting competition, such as monopolies, mergers, collusions, cartels, and other unfair trade practices on the part of enterprises in the Republic of China (Taiwan).

The FTC is different from other foreign government regulators in that the Consumer Protection functions is administered by the Consumer Protection Committee.

History
The Fair Trade Commission was created in 1992 to regulate competition and enforced trade practices. It has the powers to investigate illegal activities such as predatory pricing, collusion, cartels, mergers and other unfair trade practices that hurt choices, prices, create monopolies and reduce competition.

Structure
First Department
Second Department
Third Department
Department of Planning
Department of Legal Affairs
Secretariat 
Personnel Office
Accounting Office
Statistical Office
Civil Service Ethics Office

Chairpersons
Wang Chih-kang  (27 January 1992 – 9 June 1996)
Chao Yang-ching (10 June 1996 – 26 January 2001; acting until 26 January 1998)
 (27 January 2001 – 26 January 2007)
Yu Chao-chuan (27 January 2007 – 31 January 2007)
 (1 February 2007 – 31 July 2009)
 Wu Shiow-ming (1 August 2009 – 31 January 2017; acting until 31 January 2010)
 Huang Mei-ying (1 February 2017 – 30 January 2023)
 Lee May (李鎂) (since 31 January 2023)

Transportation
The building is accessible within walking distance South West from Shandao Temple Station of the Taipei Metro.

See also
Executive Yuan
Competition regulator

References

External links
Free Trade Commission Official Website 

Government agencies established in 1992
1992 establishments in Taiwan
Consumer organizations in Taiwan
Executive Yuan
Competition regulators
Regulation in Taiwan